Daniel Andrew Powell (29 May 1922 – 27 January 2013) was a former Australian rules footballer who played with Melbourne in the Victorian Football League (VFL).

Powell later served in both the Australian Army and the Royal Australian Air Force in World War II.

Notes

External links 

1922 births
2013 deaths
Australian rules footballers from Melbourne
Melbourne Football Club players
University Blues Football Club players
Australian military personnel of World War II
People from Carlton, Victoria